HMCS Chilliwack was a  who served with the Royal Canadian Navy during the Second World War. She saw action primarily in the Battle of the Atlantic as a convoy escort. She was named for Chilliwack, British Columbia.

Background

Flower-class corvettes like Chilliwack serving with the Royal Canadian Navy during the Second World War were different from earlier and more traditional sail-driven corvettes. The "corvette" designation was created by the French as a class of small warships; the Royal Navy borrowed the term for a period but discontinued its use in 1877. During the hurried preparations for war in the late 1930s, Winston Churchill reactivated the corvette class, needing a name for smaller ships used in an escort capacity, in this case based on a whaling ship design. The generic name "flower" was used to designate the class of these ships, which – in the Royal Navy – were named after flowering plants.

Corvettes commissioned by the Royal Canadian Navy during the Second World War were named after communities for the most part, to better represent the people who took part in building them. This idea was put forth by Admiral Percy W. Nelles. Sponsors were commonly associated with the community for which the ship was named. Royal Navy corvettes were designed as open sea escorts, while Canadian corvettes were developed for coastal auxiliary roles which was exemplified by their minesweeping gear. Eventually the Canadian corvettes would be modified to allow them to perform better on the open seas.

Construction
Chilliwack was ordered on 14 February 1940 as part of the 1939-1940 Flower-class building program.  At Burrard Dry Dock in North Vancouver, British Columbia she was laid down on 3 July 1940. Chilliwack was launched on 14 September 1940 and commissioned on 8 April 1941 at Vancouver. She is named after the city of Chilliwack, British Columbia. In April 1943 until October 1943, Chilliwack was refitting at Dartmouth, where her fo'c'sle was extended.

War service

After commissioning she was sent to Halifax, arriving on 19 June 1941. She was assigned to Newfoundland Command in July and spent the rest of the year escorting convoys between St. John's and Iceland. In February 1942 she began work as an ocean escort, a position she continued with few interruptions until November 1944.

Chilliwack participated in the battle for convoy SC 67 before assignment to Mid-Ocean Escort Force (MOEF) group C1 in June 1942.  With group C1, she shared credit for sinking U-356 during the battle for convoy ON 154, and participated in the battles for convoy SC 94 and convoy HX 222.  Chilliwack then joined MOEF group A3 in the battle for convoy ON 166. In December 1943 after completing her refit and work up, Chilliwack joined escort group W-8 of Western Escort Force. In March 1944, she assisted in the sinking of U-744 along with several other escorts while escorting convoy HX 280. Chilliwack escorted fourteen trans-Atlantic convoys without loss in 1944 and spent 1945 escorting North American coastal convoys with the Western Local Escort Force.

In April 1945 she was reassigned to Halifax Force before being lent to escort group C-1 again for one round trip in May. Chilliwack was paid off on 14 July 1945 at Sorel, Quebec. The ship was sold after the war and scrapped in 1946.

Trans-Atlantic convoys escorted

References

Flower-class corvettes of the Royal Canadian Navy
1940 ships